Salto de Pirapora is a municipality in the state of São Paulo in Brazil. It is part of the Metropolitan Region of Sorocaba.

See also
Cafundó language

References

Municipalities in São Paulo (state)